The Coupe de France is an ice hockey competition in France. It is the premier knockout cup competition organized by the French Ice Hockey Federation. Since 2006-2007, the winners have been awarded the Trophée Pete-Laliberté. Federation president Luc Tardif moved the French Cup final to the Palais ominisport de Paris-Bercy, Paris' largest and most prestigious indoor venue, where it proved an unexpected success, providing the French game with a much needed marquee event in the nation's capital.

Previous winners

References

External links
French ice hockey federation

Ice hockey competitions in France
France